Up for the Rising Sun (Cantonese: Yung po giu yeung) is a Hong Kong movie released in 1997, based on the book of the same name.

It was directed by Victor Tam Long Cheung and produced by Raymond Wong Pak Ming.

Cast
George Lam Chi Cheung
Gordon Lam
Law Shu Kei
Poon Hung
Pauline Suen
Kenneth Tsang Kong
Raymond Tso Wing Lim
Anita Yuen Wing Yee
Jessica Hester Hsuan

External links

1997 films
Hong Kong drama films
1990s Hong Kong films